Sir David Cecil, JP (c. 1460 – c. 1540) was a Welsh landowner, courtier, and Member of Parliament.

He was born into a Welsh family, the third son of Richard Cecil ap Philip Seisyllt of Alt-yr-Ynys on the border of Herefordshire and Monmouthshire, but settled near Stamford, Lincolnshire.

Cecil was an alderman of Stamford in 1504–05, 1515–16 and 1526–27. He was made a Yeoman of the Chamber by 1506, a position he held for the rest of his life. He was elected as one of the Members of Parliament for Stamford in 1504, 1510, 1512, 1515 and 1523. He was a serjeant-at-arms from 1513 to his death and appointed Justice of the Peace (J.P.) for Rutland from 1532 and High Sheriff of Northamptonshire from June 1532 to November 1533.

He probably died in September 1540 and was buried in St George's Church, Stamford. He had married twice: firstly Alice, the daughter of John Dicons of Stamford, with whom he had two sons and secondly Jane, the daughter of Thomas Roos of Dowsby, Lincolnshire and widow of Edward Villers of Flore, Northamptonshire, with whom he had a daughter. He was succeeded by his son Richard.

References

Sources
 
 

1460 births
1540 deaths
Year of birth uncertain
Year of death uncertain
Date of birth unknown
Date of death unknown
People from Northamptonshire
David
High Sheriffs of Northamptonshire
Serjeants-at-Arms of the House of Commons of England
English MPs 1504
English MPs 1510
English MPs 1512–1514
English MPs 1515
English MPs 1523
English people of Welsh descent
English courtiers
English justices of the peace
People from Stamford, Lincolnshire
Court of Henry VIII